"Madan (Exotic Disco Mix)" is the debut single by French DJ and record producer Martin Solveig, with Malian singer Salif Keita. The song was released in France as a digital download on 16 June 2003, and is from Solveig's debut studio album Sur la terre (2002). It is a remix of "Madan" by Salif Keita, first released in 2002 for the album Moffou. The song peaked at number 37 on the French Singles Chart.

Track listing

Chart performance

Weekly charts

Release history

References

2002 songs
2003 debut singles
Martin Solveig songs
Salif Keita songs
Songs written by Martin Solveig
Universal Music Group singles